Alampyris is a genus of longhorn beetles of the subfamily Lamiinae, containing the following species:

 Alampyris bicolor Martins, Santos-Silva & Galileo, 2015
 Alampyris cretaria Bates, 1885
 Alampyris curta Bates, 1881
 Alampyris flavicollis Galileo & Martins, 2005
 Alampyris fuliginea Bates, 1881
 Alampyris fusca Martins & Galileo, 2008
 Alampyris marginella Bates, 1881
 Alampyris melanophiloides (Thomson, 1868)
 Alampyris mimetica Bates, 1881
 Alampyris nigra Bates, 1881
 Alampyris photinoides Bates, 1881
 Alampyris quadricollis Bates, 1881

References

 
Hemilophini